The Asian Rowing Championship is a rowing championship organised by the Asian Rowing Federation for competitors from the Asian countries.

List tournaments

External links
Official ARF site

 
Asian
Rowing
Recurring sporting events established in 1985
1985 establishments in Hong Kong